Stajkovce is a village located in the municipality of Vlasotince, southern Serbia. According to the 2011 census, the village has a population of 1,538 inhabitants.

References

Populated places in Jablanica District